Hugh Aldersey-Williams (born 1959) is a British author and journalist. Aldersey-Williams was educated at Highgate School and studied the natural sciences at the University of Cambridge. His several books discuss issues surrounding natural and man-made designs. He has curated exhibitions at the Victoria and Albert Museum as well as the Wellcome Collection.

Aldersey-Williams is perhaps best known for his 2011 book Periodic Tales, which The Daily Telegraph described as "a paean to the building blocks of matter". The book takes a comprehensive look through world history to detail where, how, and why humanity discovered the elements. It also received praise from Kirkus Reviews, which labelled it "lucid" and "enjoyable". In October 2015 he co-curated an exhibition based on the book at Compton Verney Art Gallery, Periodic Tales: The Art of the Elements, exhibiting predominantly contemporary art works and focusing on the relationship between artistic objects and the elemental materials that go into their making.

Aldersey-Williams contributed an essay on Sir Thomas Browne to The Society for Curious Thought.

Background
Aldersey-Williams has a lifetime hobby, since his teenage days, of collecting samples of the elements and setting them up in his home.

Books
 The Most Beautiful Molecule: The Discovery of the Buckyball, John Wiley & Sons, 1995
 Zoomorphic: New Animal Architecture, Collins Design, 2003
 Periodic Tales: A Cultural History of the Elements, from Arsenic to Zinc, Ecco Press, 2011
 Anatomies: A Cultural History of the Human Body, W. W. Norton & Company, 2013
 In Search of Sir Thomas Browne: The Life and Afterlife of the Seventeenth Century's Most Inquiring Mind, W. W. Norton & Company, 2015
 Tide: The Science and Lore of the Greatest Force on Earth, Viking, 2016
 Dutch Light: Christiaan Huygens and the Making of Science in Europe, Pan Macmillan, 2020

See also
List of University of Cambridge members
List of English writers

References

External links
 Official Website - hughalderseywilliams.com

Alumni of the University of Cambridge
People educated at Highgate School
English male journalists
English science writers
Historians of science
Living people
People associated with the Victoria and Albert Museum
British science journalists
1959 births